Waddepalle or Waddepally is a Village and Mandal in Jogulamba Gadwal district, Telangana. It is administered under Gadwal Revenue Division. Waddepally is a historical village and mandal.

Geography 
Wadepalle is located on the. Northern bank of River Krishna South bank of Thunga Badra River.

Demographics 
 Census of India, Waddepalle had a population of 10,463. The total population constitute, 5,226 males and 5,237 females with a sex ratio of 1002 females per 1000 males. 1,219 children are in the age group of 0–6 years, a ratio of 966 girls per 1000 boys. The average literacy rate stands at 61.64%, slightly lower than the state average of 67.41%.

References 

Villages in Jogulamba Gadwal district